Avanon is operational risk control software, founded in Zurich, Switzerland. In October 2012 it was acquired by Thomson Reuters and integrated into the Thomson Reuters Accelus suite, to form the risk component of their governance, risk and compliance (GRC) division. The majority of clients operate in the financial services industry.

Overview
Avanon is an application which helps to manage client companies enterprise risk and compliance programs. The application is not limited to a specific industry, but deals in industries like banking, insurance and energy. Avanon provides clients continuously monitoring and feedback which enables them to manage operational risk and control. The application can be customized to support different risk and regulatory requirements (Basel Accord).

The primary customer base is Europe but has recently expanded into Africa and Asia.

External links
 Official Site

References

Risk management software
Risk management companies